Sanaka Education Trusts Group of Institutions, abbreviated as SETGOI is a private engineering institution in Durgapur, West Bengal, India which offers undergraduate(B.Tech) four-year engineering degree courses in Seven disciplines. The college is affiliated to Maulana Abul Kalam Azad University of Technology(MAKAUT). The college also offer diploma courses under affiliation of West Bengal State Council of Technical and Vocational Education and Skill Development. This institute is affiliated to AICTE and COA.

Departments
It offers admission to degree courses in Seven branches:
 Computer Science and Engineering 
 Electronics and Communication Engineering 
 Mechanical Engineering 
 Civil Engineering 
 Electrical Engineering
 Electrical and Electronics Engineering
 Bachelor of Architecture

It also offer diploma courses in three branches:
 Mechanical Engineering 
 Civil Engineering 
 Electrical Engineering

See also

References

External links 
https://www.setgoi.ac.in

Engineering colleges in West Bengal
Universities and colleges in Paschim Bardhaman district
Colleges affiliated to West Bengal University of Technology
Educational institutions established in 2008
2008 establishments in West Bengal